Quiz with Hale was an early television game show. A British series, it aired on the BBC from 1946 to 1947. Presented by Lionel Hale, the 30-minute series invited viewers to play along by marking their own quiz paper.

Page 29 (31 of file) of volume 147 of The Chemist and Druggist says episode telecast 28 December 1946 asked viewers to identify three substances from their Latin labels.

The programme is lost, as methods to record live television were not developed until late 1947, and were used very rarely by the BBC until the mid-1950s, additionally U.K. game shows were usually wiped into the 1980s.

References

External links
Quiz with Hale on IMDb

1940s British television series
1946 British television series debuts
1947 British television series endings
Lost BBC episodes
BBC Television shows
Black-and-white British television shows
BBC television game shows
1940s British game shows
British live television series